Waldstadt can mean:

a subdivision in Zossen, Germany
an alternate name for the Poking DP camp in post-World War II Germany
an alternate spelling of Waldstatt, a municipality in Switzerland
Waldstadt (Karlsruhe), a district of Karlsruhe